The 1992–93 B Group was the thirty-seventh season of the Bulgarian B Football Group, the second tier of the Bulgarian football league system. A total of 19 teams contested the league.

League table

References

1992-93
Bul
2